This is a list of Acts of the Parliament of the United Kingdom that were enacted without the consent (approval) of the House of Lords.

Pursuant to the Parliament Act 1911
The following are the Acts of Parliament enacted without the consent of the Lords via the use of the Parliament Act 1911:
Government of Ireland Act 1914
Welsh Church Act 1914
Parliament Act 1949

Pursuant to the Parliament Acts 1911 and 1949
The following are the Acts of Parliament enacted without the consent of the Lords via the use of the Parliament Acts 1911 and 1949:
War Crimes Act 1991
European Parliamentary Elections Act 1999
Sexual Offences (Amendment) Act 2000
Hunting Act 2004

See also
 List of Acts of Parliament in the United Kingdom

References

Notes

Lists of Acts of the Parliament of the United Kingdom
1910s in the United Kingdom
1940s in the United Kingdom
1990s in the United Kingdom
2000s in the United Kingdom